Bamburi Airport is an airport in Kenya.

Location
Bamburi Airport  is located in Mombasa County, in the town of Bamburi, in southeastern Kenya, close to the Indian Ocean coast.

The geographic coordinates of this airport are:3° 58' 48.00"S, 39° 43' 48.00"E (Latitude: -3.98000; Longitude:39.73000).

Overview
Bamburi Airport is a small airport that serves the town of Bamburi. At the moment, there is no scheduled airline service to Bamburi Airport.

See also
 Bamburi
 Mombasa County
 Coast Province
 Kenya Airports Authority
 Kenya Civil Aviation Authority
 List of airports in Kenya

References

External links
  Location of Bamburi Airport At Google Maps
  Website of Kenya Airports Authority
  Airkenya Flight Routes

Airports in Kenya
Coast Province
Mombasa County